Milislav Popovic (born 6 March 1997) is an Australian footballer currently playing as a forward for Luxembourg National Division club Victoria Rosport.

Career statistics

Club
.

Notes

References

1997 births
Living people
Australian soccer players
Australia youth international soccer players
Australian expatriate soccer players
Australian expatriate sportspeople in Germany
Association football forwards
A-League Men players
Regionalliga players
2. Liga (Austria) players
Blacktown City FC players
Macarthur FC players
S.S. Lazio players
TSV Havelse players
1. FC Köln II players
Eintracht Braunschweig II players
SV Lafnitz players
Australian expatriate sportspeople in Italy
Expatriate footballers in Italy
Australian expatriate sportspeople in Austria
Expatriate footballers in Austria
Australian expatriate sportspeople in Bulgaria
Expatriate footballers in Bulgaria
Australian people of Serbian descent
Soccer players from Sydney